Armas Otto Aapo Väisänen (9 April 1890 – 18 July 1969) was an eminent Finnish scholar of folk music, an ethnographer and ethnomusicologist.

Väisänen was born in Savonranta. In the early twentieth century he documented, in recordings and photographs, traditional Finnish music and musicians. 
With a scholarship from the Finno-Ugrian Society Väisänen traveled to Russia in 1914 to collect Finnish folk melodies. He made field trips to Mordovia, Ingria, Veps, Russian Karelia.
His activities also marked the a new stage in the history of collecting Seto folk songs in Southern Estonia. After the first trip in 1912 he made 6 fieldtrips to Estonia between 1912 and 1923.

Between 1926 and 1957 Väisänen hold the position of the head of the folk music department at the Sibelius Academy, Helsinki, Finland. He was the professor of musicology at University of Helsinki from 1956 to 1959. He died in Helsinki, aged 79.

References

1890 births
1969 deaths
People from Savonlinna
People from Mikkeli Province (Grand Duchy of Finland)
Finnish ethnographers
University of Helsinki alumni
Academic staff of the University of Helsinki